Phillip Reccius (June 7, 1862 – February 15, 1903) was an American Major League Baseball player from Louisville, Kentucky, who played for eight seasons in the majors, mainly playing third base for his hometown team, the Louisville Eclipse.

Phil had two brothers who were also involved heavily in baseball. John Reccius was a Major League player for two seasons, also for the Eclipse, and Bill Reccius was the founder and manager for the mid-1870s version of the Louisville Eclipse, though he did not manage or play in the majors. Phil and his brothers were childhood friends of other ballplayers who came from Louisville area, such as Pete Browning, and Jimmy Wolf.

Phil died at the age of 40 in Louisville, and is interred at Cave Hill Cemetery.

References

External links

1862 births
1902 deaths
19th-century baseball players
Cleveland Blues (1887–88) players
Louisville Colonels players
Louisville Eclipse players
Major League Baseball third basemen
Baseball players from Louisville, Kentucky
Rochester Broncos players
Burials at Cave Hill Cemetery
Minor league baseball managers
Memphis Browns players
Sioux City Corn Huskers players
Memphis Grays players
London Tecumsehs (baseball) players
Memphis (minor league baseball) players
Evansville Hoosiers players
Terre Haute (minor league baseball) players
Spokane Bunchgrassers players
Buffalo Bisons (minor league) players
Macon Hornets players
Evansville Black Birds players
Henderson (minor league baseball) players